Leonell C. Strong ( – ) was a cancer research scientist and amateur cryptographer.

In 1947 he published a translation of two pages of the Voynich Manuscript in which he claimed that the author was Anthony Askham (who, in fact lived about a century after the VM has since been proved to have been created).

In 1978 he received the William B. Coley Award.

External links 
 A selection of his letters
 His personal papers
 Biography
 Another biography
 Strong, L C (1976). "A Baconian in cancer research: autobiographical essay". Cancer Res Cancer research. 36 (10): 3534–53. ISSN 0008-5472. OCLC 115888750.

1894 births
1982 deaths
Cancer researchers